The Red Sea Project, commonly referred to as The Red Sea, is a land and property megaproject currently in development in Saudi Arabia that is managed by Red Sea Global and forms part of the Saudi Vision 2030 program. The project was announced by the Saudi Crown Prince Mohammad bin Salman in July 2017, focusing on luxury and ecotourism to attract visitors to the Red Sea coast. 

Construction began at The Red Sea in February 2019 and on completion in 2030 it is expected to increase the Saudi GDP by $5.86 billion per year. The first three hotels are expected to open in 2023 while phase one is expected to be completed in 2024, when 3,000 hotel rooms in 16 hotels will be constructed along with the Red Sea International Airport, a yachting marina, historical sites and recreation centers. It is capping visitors to one million people per year from 2030 onwards to prevent overtourism.

On completion in 2030, The Red Sea aims to have 50 hotels with 8,000 rooms, and more than 1,000 residential properties across 22 islands and six inland sites.

Location 
The project is located on the west coast of Saudi Arabia in a 28,000 km2 area in Tabuk province between the cities of Umluj and Al-Wajh. The area includes 90 unspoiled offshore islands, 200km of coastline on the Red Sea, beaches, desert, mountains and volcanoes.

Phase one 
The first phase of the project is planned to be completed by 2024 with 16 hotels while its first three hotels will open in 2023. Phase one will include the following facilities:

16 luxury and hyper-luxury hotels 
Marinas, leisure and lifestyle amenities
The Red Sea International Airport
The 16 hotels are being built in five locations: two inland and three on islands. Shura Island (formerly known as Shurayrah Island and also known as Coral Bloom) is the project's hub island and is where 11 hotel brands will be located, a yachting marina, retail and entertainment area, and 18-hole championship golf course. All 11 hotels on Shura Island were designed by British architects Foster + Partners to blend into the natural environment.

Two resorts will be located at Ummahat Island, one at Sheybarah Island, one inland at Southern Dunes, and another inland at Desert Rock.

See also
Neom
Amaala

Notes and references 
Notes

References

Tourist attractions in Saudi Arabia
Tabuk Province
Economy of Saudi Arabia
Proposed infrastructure in Saudi Arabia

Tourism
Sustainability
